Manushya Mrugam is a 2011 Indian Malayalam-language mystery film written, directed and starring Baburaj and Prithviraj Sukumaran. It was produced by his wife Vani Viswanath; the film co-stars Kiran Rathod, and Oviya. The story is about sexual exploitation of young girls. The film was released on 15 July 2011. It was dubbed and released in Tamil as Police Rajyam (2017) and in Hindi as Police Raaj (2020).

Plot
Johnny is a lorry driver with an insatiable sex drive. Married to Lissy, he has an eye for a young girl Sophie who has come to stay with them. He repeatedly tries to goad her to marry him, but she doesn't comply and Lissy gets angry on his behaviour and scolds him. In a fit of rage, he kills Lissy with a knife and rapes and kills Sophie and his eleven-year-old daughter Jeena. He is arrested and sent to the jail where he gets tortured by his jail mates.

Crime Branch Officer David J Mathew goes probing into the case and finds out that Johnny killed another person during the crime. When David and his men questions him, Johnny tells that the 4th person whom he killed was Kamal Paasha, a young man who hails from Bangalore. He reveals that he didn't kill his family and Paasha was the one who killed them. He reveals that Paasha was in love with Lissy but she didn't accept it and he was arrested for a false case made by her father Kochupaulose for loving her. Lissy didn't tell Johnny about Paasha as she didn't want Paasha being killed by Johnny and she wants to live with him and Jeena. Johnny overhears the conversation between them. He also hears that Lissy was pregnant was Paasha's child and the child was Jeena. He tries to tell her that Jeena is his daughter but she says that Jeena is Johnny's daughter. Paasha wanted to take Lissy with him but she refuses. Angrily, Paasha goes to their house and kills Sophie and Jeena. When Lissy finds them dead, she slashes him on his hand with a knife and in a fit of rage, Paasha kills Lissy. In revenge, Johnny kills Paasha and throws his body to the river.

He tells the police that he killed his family as he considered it as a punishment of him planning to marry Sophie and for Lissy who planned a new life. He tells David to not tell the truth anyone. David and his men reports to the media that Johnny killed Paasha and his family when Lissy planned to marry Sophie to Paasha to save her from Johnny and he couldn't tolerate it. He plans to reveal the truth once when they find Paasha's corpse.

Cast

Production
Manushya Mrugam is the second directorial of actor Baburaj, scripted by himself and produced by his wife Vani Viswanath. The film is not related to the 1980 Malayalam film of the same name. The film features music composed by Sayan Anwar, while the lyrics were penned by Vayalar Sarath Chandra Varma.

Soundtrack
1. Ashwaroodanaya - Jassie gift

2. Aalin Kombil - Manjari

3. Nerinu Verulla - Benny Dayal

References

External links
 

2011 films
2010s Malayalam-language films